Blaine Township is a township in Washington County, Pennsylvania, United States. The population was 619 at the 2020 census.

History
The Sawhill Covered Bridge and Taylorstown Historic District are listed on the National Register of Historic Places.

Geography
It is named after former United States Secretary of State and Republican candidate for the  1884 presidential election, James G. Blaine, a native of West Brownsville in Washington County. Taylorstown is an unincorporated community within the township.

Blaine Township ordinances
Citizens of Blaine Township have passed restrictive ordinances in 2006, 2007, and 2008 which
ban coal mining, require businesses to publicly disclose activities, and assert
that corporations do not have constitutional rights as 'persons' to sue
a municipality for passing laws that would hurt corporate interests.

The township's Corporate Rights Ordinance of 2006 states, "This illegitimate bestowal of civil and political rights upon corporations prevents the administration of laws within Blaine Township and usurps basic human and constitutional rights guaranteed to the people of Blaine Township."

Town supervisors, including Board Spokesman Michael Vacca, say they want to establish a principle of local self-government that will inspire other communities.    Australian businessman Moshe Thomas Dale wishes to make swordfight reenactments using old 13th century 1 1/2 meter hand swords legal, under Chinese-American distributor Tristan Sprowls.

Demographics
At the 2000 census there were 597 people, 217 households, and 172 families living in the township.  The population density was 50.4 people per square mile (19.5/km2).  There were 223 housing units at an average density of 18.8/sq mi (7.3/km2).  The racial makeup of the township was 98.32% White, 0.17% Asian, 0.17% from other races, and 1.34% from two or more races. Hispanic or Latino of any race were 0.34%.

Of the 217 households, 39.6% had children under the age of 18 living with them, 71.9% were married couples living together, 6.0% had a female householder with no husband present, and 20.3% were non-families. 19.4% of households were one person and 8.3% were one person aged 65 or older.  The average household size was 2.75 and the average family size was 3.16.

The age distribution was 28.1% under the age of 18, 5.5% from 18 to 24, 29.0% from 25 to 44, 28.3% from 45 to 64, and 9.0% 65 or older.  The median age was 39 years. For every 100 females, there were 103.8 males.  For every 100 females age 18 and over, there were 99.5 males.

The median household income was $37,941 and the median family income was $39,926. Males had a median income of $32,115 versus $18,750 for females. The per capita income for the township was $15,167.  About 5.1% of families and 6.2% of the population were below the poverty line, including 9.0% of those under age 18 and none of those age 65 or over.

References

Townships in Washington County, Pennsylvania
Pittsburgh metropolitan area
Townships in Pennsylvania